"Curiosity killed the cat" is a proverb used to warn of the dangers of unnecessary investigation or experimentation. It also implies that being curious can sometimes lead to danger or misfortune. The original form of the proverb, now rarely used, was "Care killed the cat". In this instance, "care" was defined as "worry" or "sorrow for others."

Origin
The earliest printed reference to the original proverb appears in the 1598 play, Every Man in His Humour, written by the English playwright Ben Jonson:

The play was first performed by Shakespeare's playing company, the Lord Chamberlain's Men. Shakespeare used a similar quote in his circa 1599 play, Much Ado About Nothing:

The proverb remained the same until at least 1898. Ebenezer Cobham Brewer included this definition in his Dictionary of Phrase and Fable:

Transformation
The origin of the modern variation is unknown. It is found in an Irish newspaper from 1868: "They say curiosity killed a cat once."  An early printed reference to the actual phrase "Curiosity killed the cat" is in James Allan Mair's 1873 compendium A handbook of proverbs: English, Scottish, Irish, American, Shakesperean, and scriptural; and family mottoes, where it is listed as an Irish proverb on page 34.
In the 1902 edition of Proverbs: Maxims and Phrases, by John Hendricks Bechtel, the phrase "Curiosity killed the cat" is the lone entry under the topic "Curiosity" on page 100.

O. Henry's 1909 short story "Schools and Schools" includes a mention that suggests knowledge of the proverb had become widespread by that time:

The phrase itself was the headline of a story in The Washington Post on 4 March 1916 (page 6):

CURIOSITY KILLED THE CAT...

Four Departments of New York City Government Summoned to Rescue Feline.

From the New York World.

Curiosity, as you may recall—

On the fifth floor of the apartment house at 203 West 130th street lives Miss Mable Godfrey. When she came to the house about seven months ago she brought Blackie, a cat of several years' experience of life.

The cat seldom left the apartment. He was a hearth cat, not a fence cat, and did not dearly love to sing. In other respects he was normal and hence curious.

Last Tuesday afternoon when Miss Godfrey was out Blackie skipped into the grate fireplace in a rear room. He had done this many times before. But he had not climbed up the flue to the chimney. This he did Tuesday. Blackie there remained, perched on the top of the screen separating the apartment flue from the main chimney, crying for assistance. Miss Godfrey, returning, tried to induce her pet to come down. If you are experienced in felinity, you know that Blackie didn't come down.

On Wednesday the cat, curiosity unsatisfied, tried to climb higher—and fell to the first floor. His cries could still be heard by Miss Godfrey; who, to effect Blackie's rescue, communicated with the following departments:

1. Police department.
2. Fire department.
3. Health department.
4. Building department.
5. Washington Heights court.

Among them they lowered a rope to Blackie. But it availed neither the cat nor them anything.

Thursday morning, just before noon, a plumber opened the rear wall back of the chimney. Blackie was taken out. His fall had injured his back. Ten minutes later Blackie died.

Despite these earlier appearances, the proverb has been wrongly attributed to Eugene O'Neill, who included the variation, "Curiosity killed a cat!" in his play Diff'rent from 1920:

"…but satisfaction brought it back"

"Curiosity killed the cat, but satisfaction brought it back" is a variation that includes the rejoinder "but satisfaction brought it back." Although the original version was used to warn of the dangers of unnecessary investigation or experimentation, the addition of the rejoinder indicates that the risk would lead to resurrection because of the satisfaction felt after finding out.  The resurrection element may be a reference to the "multiple lives" of a cat.

Origin

On 10 August 1905, The Galveston Daily News newspaper (page 6) printed the following quotation without the word satisfaction:

On 23 December 1912, the earliest known printed reference to this variation of the proverb is found in The Titusville Herald newspaper (page 6):

You will find greater values here. We are told:
"Curiosity killed the cat,
But satisfaction brought it back."
It is the same story with groceries.
"Prices will sell Groceries, but it is always final-
ity that brings the buyer back."

The proverb appears to have become well known soon after, as these quotes indicate.

The Harrisburg Patriot newspaper (page 2), 26 March 1917:

The Jewell Record newspaper (page 3), 15 May 1924:

Modern usage
The album New Values (1979) by Iggy Pop contains the song "Curiosity" written by Iggy Pop and Scott Thurston. The song includes the following lines:
Curiosity killed the cat but what it found brought it back.

Stephen King's 1977 horror novel, The Shining, includes the following lines:
Curiosity killed the cat, my dear redrum.
Redrum my dear, satisfaction brought him back.

References

External links

"Curiosity Killed The Cat" at GoEnglish.com (with illustration)
Henry, O. Schools and Schools. (Gutenberg text)
Jonson, Ben. Every Man in His Humour. (Gutenberg text)
O'Neill, Eugene. Diff'rent. (Gutenberg text)
Shakespeare, William. Much Ado About Nothing. (Gutenberg text)
Brewer, E. Cobham. Dictionary of Phrase and Fable.
Mair, J.A. (ed.). A handbook of proverbs: English, Scottish, Irish, American, Shakesperean, and scriptural; and family mottoes.

English proverbs
Metaphors referring to cats